Seven merchant ships have been named SS Samuel Mather.

 , U.S. propeller, bulk freighter, Official No. 116142.
 SS Samuel Mather (1906), U.S. propeller, Official No. 203407.
 SS Samuel Mather (1926), U.S. propeller, Official No. 225409.
 William Mclauchlan, U.S. propeller built in 1926, renamed Samuel Mather from 1966–1975, Official No. 226176.
 Henry II Ford, U.S. propeller built in 1924, renamed Samuel Mather from 1989 - 1994 but never operated under that name, Official No. 223,980.
 Frank Armstrong, U.S. propeller built in 1943, renamed Samuel Mather in 1976, Official No. 243425.

References

Ship names